Sidhauli is a town and an Ideal Notified Area Council (Nagar Panchayat) in Sitapur district in the Indian state of Uttar Pradesh. It comes under Lucknow division and is in the Awadh region of eastern Uttar Pradesh. Four-lane National Highway 24 passes from the centre of the town. It comes under Mohanlalganj (Lok Sabha constituency). Sidhauli is also a Sidhauli (Assembly constituency) of Uttar Pradesh Legislative Assembly.
It is the Headquarters of Tehsil Sidhauli and Sidhauli Community Development Block. Sidhauli Block comprises 306 Gram Panchayats.

Geography 

Sidhauli has an average elevation of 138 metres (452 feet). The relief of the town is entirely flat, as are most other towns in the Ganges valley. There exists no prominent geomorphic feature. The river Sarayan, which meets the river Gomati further on, flows at distance of about 5 kilometres from the town. Because the town is located on alluvial soil, the water table in this region rarely falls below 50 feet. The town receives most of its rainfall during the South-West Monsoon. During the monsoon, the water table rises to 25–30 feet.

History 

The name of the town, "Sidhauli", comes from the Sanskrit words "Siddhi" (Power of attainment of the supreme) and "Awali" (Home). Accordingly, the name means "Home of great Sages and Saints".

Sidhauli borders on Naimisaranya, which has been one of the holiest places in Hinduism since ancient times. Many great saints and sages are reputed to have lived in the forests of this area.

Copper age implements of 1500 bc to 1000 bc such as Axis, Rings, Celts, Daggers etc found in sidhauli area, who kept in state Memorial Lucknow.

In 1942, during the Quit India Movement, Mahatma Gandhi came to Sidhauli. During this time, Tara Chand Maheshwery was an eminent and prominent Sidhauli leader who was very close to Gandhi.

Demographics 

, according to the Indian census, Sidhauli had a population of 569,117. Males constitute 52.98% of the population and females 47.01%. Sidhauli has an average literacy rate of 53.63%, lower than the national average of 74.04%: male literacy is 62.14%, and female literacy is only 44.04%. In Sidhauli, 16.34% of the population is under 6 years of age.

Administration

Sidhuli Town is a notified area with 14 wards.

Ward Number 1. Bahadurpur 
Ward Number 2. Tulsi Nagar
Ward Number 3. Narottam Nagar South
Ward Number 4. Sant Nagar East 
Ward Number 5. Sant Nagar West 
Ward Number 6. Bazar 
Ward Number 7. Gandhinagar north
Ward Number 8. Siddheshwar Nagar 
ward Number 9. Gandhinagar South 
ward Number 10. Prem Nagar North 
Ward Number 11. Narottam Nagar North 
Ward Number 12. Prem Nagar South 
Ward Number 13. Vivek Nagar
Ward Number 14. Govind Nagar

Administrative Office
Ideal Notified Area Council Office (Adarsh Nagar Panchayat Karyalaya), Mishrikh Road
 Tahsil of Sidhauli, Tahsil Road 
 Police Station, Tahsil Road 
 SDM Office, Tahsil Road 
 Indian Post Office, Tahsil Road 
 Block Development Office, Mishrikh Road 
 Circuit House (Dak Bangla), Mishrikh Road 
 Fire Station, Mishrikh Road, Aladadpur 
 Power Station, Power House Road 
 Sidhauli Forest Circle Office, Biswan Road, Bahadurpur

Current Officiels/Politociens

Transport and Communication 
The town of Sidhauli is well connected by road and rail to the state capital Lucknow, and to the national capital New Delhi. The town has a bus stop where most buses (public and private) plying on the Lucknow-Sitapur-Bareilly-Rampur-Moradabad-Delhi route stop for a while. It has a broad gauge railway station and a railway line between Sitapur Junction and Lucknow City Junction. The town has no aerodrome facility. The nearest airport is Chaudhary Charan Singh International Airport, in Lucknow. The town is covered by mobile telephone and internet services (4G services) provided by several public and private telecommunication companies.

Education and Health Facilities
The town has a well equipped government-run community health centre or rural hospital. Apart from the community health centre, there are several private clinics, hospitals and nursing homes. There are several primary, secondary and senior secondary schools which provide education through Hindi, English and Urdu. Gandhi Postgraduate (PG) College is a renowned college located along National Highway 24.

Research Institute 
Krishi Vigyan Kendra, Village Amberpur, Manva-Sandila State Highway.
It was sanctioned by the Indian Council of Agricultural Research, Ministry of Agriculture & Farmer Welfare, New Delhi on 19 May 2005, under the Administrative control of Manav Vikas Evam Sewa Sansthan, in Lucknow.

See also 
 Hargovind Bhargava
 Manish Rawat
 Sidhauli, Darbhanga

Filmography
The film Pyar Mein Thoda Twist was shot in Paisiya village in Sidhauli. The film was produced by Manju Bharti and co-producers Vijay Singh Bhadauria, Ajita Bhadauria and Noor Fatima along with director Partho Ghosh. Film music director is famous singer Bappi Lahrai. Film Lafange Nawab & Khajuraho Dreams were also shot in manva teela.

Photo Gallery

References 

Cities and towns in Sitapur district